Weweantic is a census-designated place (CDP) in the town of Wareham in Plymouth County, Massachusetts, United States. The population was 2,105 at the 2010 census.

Geography
Weweantic is located at  (41.741503, -70.739099).

According to the United States Census Bureau, the CDP has a total area of 4.6 km (1.8 mi), of which 3.3 km (1.3 mi) is land and 1.3 km (0.5 mi) (27.84%) is water.

Demographics

As of the census of 2000, there were 1,903 people, 730 households, and 522 families residing in the CDP. The population density was 578.5/km (1,500.0/mi). There were 857 housing units at an average density of 260.5/km (675.5/mi). The racial makeup of the CDP was 89.07% White, 2.79% African American, 0.95% Native American, 0.47% Asian, 3.84% from other races, and 2.89% from two or more races. Hispanic or Latino of any race were 1.26% of the population.

There were 730 households, out of which 27.8% had children under the age of 18 living with them, 53.8% were married couples living together, 12.3% had a female householder with no husband present, and 28.4% were non-families. 24.8% of all households were made up of individuals, and 11.1% had someone living alone who was 65 years of age or older. The average household size was 2.61 and the average family size was 3.08.

In the CDP, the population was spread out, with 24.7% under the age of 18, 6.8% from 18 to 24, 27.9% from 25 to 44, 25.5% from 45 to 64, and 15.1% who were 65 years of age or older. The median age was 40 years. For every 100 females, there were 95.4 males. For every 100 females age 18 and over, there were 88.6 males.

The median income for a household in the CDP was $47,895, and the median income for a family was $50,192. Males had a median income of $45,188 versus $27,303 for females. The per capita income for the CDP was $23,286. About 6.0% of families and 9.0% of the population were below the poverty line, including 20.8% of those under age 18 and 3.7% of those age 65 or over.

References

Wareham, Massachusetts
Census-designated places in Plymouth County, Massachusetts
Census-designated places in Massachusetts